Trenntsee is a lake in the Ludwigslust-Parchim district in Mecklenburg-Vorpommern, Germany. At an elevation of 8.6 m, its surface area is 1.06 km2.

Lakes of Mecklenburg-Western Pomerania